The Battle of Palmyra (1 July 1941) was part of the Allied invasion of Syria during the Syria-Lebanon campaign in World War II. British mechanised cavalry and an Arab Legion desert patrol broke up a Vichy French mobile column north-east of the city of Palmyra. They captured four officers and 60 men, which provoked the surrender of the Vichy garrison at Palmyra.

Background

In 1941, the Vichy French had substantial forces in the region and had allowed their air bases to be used as staging posts by the Germans to send aircraft to take part in the Anglo-Iraqi War. They had also allowed the Germans to use the railway system to send arms and ammunition to Iraq. On 8 June 1941, the Allies had launched two northerly attacks from Palestine and Trans-Jordan into Lebanon and Syria to prevent any further interference to Allied interests in the region. By late June, Damascus had been taken and the Allied campaign commander, Henry Maitland Wilson was ready to launch two further thrusts, this time from western Iraq to complete the capture of Syria.

An expanded Brigade group called Habforce had during the Anglo-Iraqi war advanced across the desert from Trans-Jordan to relieve the British garrison at RAF Habbaniya on the Euphrates River and had then assisted in the taking of Baghdad. This force was now pulled back to the remote part of Iraq near the Trans-Jordan and Syrian borders. It was tasked with advancing northwest to defeat the Vichy French garrison at Palmyra and secure the oil pipeline from Haditha in Iraq to Tripoli on the Lebanon coast. Habforce was well suited to the task in the desert because of the inclusion in its strength of the battalion-sized Arab Legion Mechanised Regiment, which was made up exclusively of desert-dwelling Bedouin soldiers.

In Palmyra, the core of the French defense was Fort Weygand, located northeast of the ancient ruins. Other posts were placed in the oasis, the ancient city, the hills and at the castle. The area was defended by the 187 legionnaires of the 15th company of the 6th Foreign Infantry Regiment, by Bedouins of the 1st light company of the desert, and some air force crawlers. In total, these forces brought together about 300 men under the command of Commander Ghérardi.

On the other hand, the British mobilized a thousand men in battle, commanded by Major-General John Clark. These troops were part of the column of Brigadier James Joseph Kingstone of the Habforce and included the 4th Cavalry Brigade, elements of the Arab Legion of John Bagot Glubb, known as "Glubb Pasha", and the 1st Infantry Battalion of the Regiment of Essex.

The Palmyra actions

Habforce split into three columns (two to make flanking manoeuvres on each side of Palmyra). Each one was guided by a detachment from the Arab Legion; they set off on 21 June. A skirmish with pillboxes on the pipeline a few miles east of Palmyra resulted in the element of surprise being lost. Habforce surrounded Palmyra, sending the Arab Legion troops out on wide-ranging desert patrols to protect Habforce's flanks and lines of communication. On 28 June, they captured the French fort of Seba' Biyar (roughly 60 miles south-west of Palmyra), with the small garrison surrendering without a shot being fired. The next day they occupied Sukhna, some 40 miles north-east of Palmyra, which was not occupied by French troops.

On the morning of 1 July, Sukhna was attacked by the Vichy 2nd Light Desert Company. The Arab Legion occupiers had been reinforced by a squadron from 4th Cavalry Brigade's Household Cavalry Regiment and after a sharp battle, the French retreated before an enthusiastic charge by Arab Legion troopers and ended up trapped in a box valley before surrendering. Whilst hardly the largest battle of the war, its effect was to cause the 3rd Light Desert Company which was garrisoning Palmyra, to lose heart and surrender on the night of 2 July. This freed Habforce to move 40 miles west along the pipeline to Homs and threaten the communications of the Vichy forces fighting the Australian 7th Division on the Lebanese coast.

See also
 Habforce order of battle as part of Iraqforce

Notes

References

Further reading
 
 

Palmyra
Palmyra
1941 in France
1941 in Mandatory Syria
Palmyra
Palmyra
July 1941 events